The Big Knockover is the Swedish punk group No Fun at All's third album, released on 13 July 1997.

All music by Mikael Danielsson except track 1, which was co-written by Jimmie Olsson. All lyrics by Ingemar Jansson. Published by Misty Music.

Track listing
 "Catch Me Running Round"
 "Suicide Machine"
 "Should Have Known"
 "Lose Another Friend"
 "When the Time Comes"
 "Sorry Lad"
 "Everything Inside"
 "The Other Side"
 "Away from the Circle"
 "Nobody’s Perfect"
 "Your Feeble Mind"
 "Ultramar"
 "Break My Back"

The title, "The Big Knockover," is taken from a short story by Dashiell Hammett.  This short story was also a source of inspiration for the film "The Usual Suspects."

1997 albums
No Fun at All albums
Burning Heart Records albums